Juan Carlos Muñoz Abogabir (born 22 June 1970) is a Chilean politician and civil engineer who currently serves as Minister of Transportation and Telecommunications.

References

External links
 

1970 births
Living people
Chilean people
Chilean people of Palestinian descent
Pontifical Catholic University of Chile alumni
University of California, Berkeley alumni
21st-century Chilean politicians
Government ministers of Chile